Logrolling is trading of favors, especially in politics.

Logrolling, log rolling, or log roll may also refer to:

Logrolling (sport), sport involving balancing on submerged wooden logs
A stage of log driving, literal rolling of logs
Logrolling (medicine), moving a patient without flexing the patient's spine
Pecan log roll, a confectionery
Sideways roll in gymnastics